Michel Emanuel Tabárez Soria (born 29 March 1995) is an Uruguayan footballer who last played for CA Fénix.

Career statistics

Club

Notes

References

1995 births
Living people
Association football goalkeepers
Uruguayan footballers
Uruguay youth international footballers
Uruguayan Primera División players
Centro Atlético Fénix players